Sharon Murrell (born 1946) is a Canadian politician. She represented the electoral district of Battleford-Cut Knife in the Legislative Assembly of Saskatchewan from 1995 to 1999.

She was elected in the 1995 provincial election as a New Democratic Party MLA. In the 1999 election, however, she was defeated by Saskatchewan Party challenger Rudi Peters.

References

Living people
Saskatchewan New Democratic Party MLAs
Women MLAs in Saskatchewan
1946 births